New York's 21st State Senate district is one of 63 districts in the New York State Senate. It has been represented by Democrat Kevin Parker since 2003.

Geography
District 21 is located in central Brooklyn, incorporating parts of Flatbush, East Flatbush, Midwood, Ditmas Park, Kensington, Windsor Terrace, and Park Slope.

The district overlaps with New York's 7th, 8th, 9th, and 10th congressional districts, and with the 41st, 42nd, 43rd, 44th, 51st, 52nd, 57th, 58th, and 59th districts of the New York State Assembly.

Recent election results

2020

2018

2016

2014

2012

Federal results in District 21

References

21